The Chesilhurst Borough School District is a defunct community public school district that had served students in Kindergarten through sixth grade from Chesilhurst, New Jersey, United States. As of 2009, the district was no longer operating any schools and instead is sending all of its students to the Winslow Township School District as part of a sending/receiving relationship.

As of the 2007/08 school year, the district's one school had an enrollment of 104 students and 8.0 classroom teachers (on an FTE basis), for a student–teacher ratio of 13.0.

The district was classified by the New Jersey Department of Education as being in District Factor Group "A", the lowest of eight groupings. District Factor Groups organize districts statewide to allow comparison by common socioeconomic characteristics of the local districts. From lowest socioeconomic status to highest, the categories are A, B, CD, DE, FG, GH, I and J.

Schools
Shirley B. Foster Elementary School served 104 students as of the 2007-08 school year.

Administration
Core members of the district's administration were:
none, Superintendent
Frank Badessa, Business Administrator / Board Secretary

References

External links

School Data for the Chesilhurst Borough School District, National Center for Education Statistics

Chesilhurst, New Jersey
New Jersey District Factor Group A
School districts in Camden County, New Jersey